Unirea is a commune located in Brăila County, Muntenia, Romania. It is composed of three villages: Morotești, Unirea and Valea Cânepii.

References

Communes in Brăila County
Localities in Muntenia